Bucculatrix chrysanthemella is a moth in the family Bucculatricidae. It was described by Hans Rebel in 1896. It is found on the Canary Islands. The species has been introduced in France, Italy, Great Britain and Finland.

The wingspan is 6.5-7.5 mm.

The larvae feed on Argyranthemum frutescens, Argyranthemum teneriffae and Gonospermum fruticosum. They mine the leaves of their host plant.
The mine starts as a long gallery with a black central frass line. Older larvae create fleck mines by slicing open the leaf margin and mining into the leaf tissue from there. Larvae can be found from January to March.

References

Natural History Museum Lepidoptera generic names catalog

Bucculatricidae
Moths described in 1896
Taxa named by Hans Rebel
Moths of Africa
Moths of Europe
Leaf miners